Adrian State (born 28 June 1968) is a retired Romanian football striker.

References

External links

1968 births
Living people
Romanian footballers
Liga I players
ASC Oțelul Galați players
FC Steaua București players
CSM Ceahlăul Piatra Neamț players
FC Argeș Pitești players
FCV Farul Constanța players
FCM Dunărea Galați players
Association football forwards
Sportspeople from Galați